The following is a list of currently active military aircraft in the United States Air Force.

Aircraft

Current inventory

Images

See also
Future military aircraft of the United States
List of military aircraft of the United States
List of U.S. DoD aircraft designations
List of currently active United States naval aircraft
List of United States Air Force squadrons
List of active U.S. Air Force aircraft squadrons
UAVs in the U.S. military

Notes

References

United States Air Force lists
Military aircraft